NickMusic is an American pay television network and spin-off of Nickelodeon that mainly carries music video and music-related programming from younger pop artists that appeal to Nickelodeon's target audience, with some videos edited for content to meet a general TV-PG rating applied across the network's broadcast day, or replaced with a lyric video instead.

Like its sibling music video-only networks BET Jams, BET Soul, and CMT Music, NickMusic is based on an automated "wheel" schedule that was introduced during the early years of MTV2. A new loop starts at 6 a.m. Eastern Time, and is then repeated at 2 p.m. and 10 p.m.

History

As MTV Hits 
The network launched on May 1, 2002, with its programming composed entirely of music videos. As with MTV Jams, the network was named for a daily program on MTV; in this case, MTV Hits, which was that network's main pop music video program. The network composed of current hit music videos, along with a few older videos from earlier in the year, as well as a few from the late 1990s. The network maintained a commercial-free format, other than internal promotions for MTV and MTV-branded properties.

My Hitlist era (2005–2006) 

In 2005, the network began airing a feature called "My Hitlist Month", which was based on viewer selected playlists, submitted to a newly launched network website. This, as well as artist-selected playlists, aired occasionally on the network through 2006.

Playlistism era (2006–2011) 
On December 18, 2006, the "Hit List" theme returned to MTV Hits. At first, "Playlistism" composed of replays of the viewer hit lists from the past, as well as new playlists from sister networks MTV2 and MTVU, as well as artist and themed playlists. In 2009, the network began to accept traditional commercial advertising, which generally composes of direct response advertising and in the past, ads for ringtone providers.

March 2012 reimaging 

Until March 26, 2012, the network's logo remained the same since its launch, with a minor readjustment in February 2010 of the iconic "M" to remove the Music Television tagline and a small quarter of the logo in line with the official rebranding of all MTV networks. A new logo and imaging was introduced on that date, featuring all text in bold Helvetica, including a minimal-style logo with the 2010 MTV logomark next to the word "Hits". MTV Jams followed with the same reimaging on April 13.

Final schedule 
The network discontinued many of the playlist shows throughout 2009 and 2010, while keeping the Playlistism name until it faded out entirely by late January 2011, when the network restored its former 'illustration from a music box' imaging to identify the network between commercial blocks. The lower-left banner which formerly listed playlist dedications became dedicated to promotional messages and a rolling advertisement for the network's music video web portal before eventually being discontinued. MTV News segments (usually not pertaining to news but press junket segments about upcoming films and albums) also aired, before being removed in early 2015 due to various financial issues within Viacom and a reorganization of the news division back towards current events.

Generally, except for artists which were popular before the period, all music videos carried by MTV Hits were from the era after the 1998 premiere of Total Request Live, with a heavy focus on current music.

Trademark reuse for Internet service (2019–2020) 
The MTV Hits branding returned to use by Viacom on May 13, 2019, as an Apple TV+ and Amazon channel offered by Viacom charging $5.99 monthly, which carried MTV archival programming (the aforementioned "Hits" in this form) from the mid-1990s to the early 2010s. No music video programming was offered by the MTV Hits service. The service's programming was merged onto what is now Paramount+ in the fall of 2020.

As NickMusic 
On September 9, 2016, the channel came under the editorial control of Nickelodeon and was rebranded as NickMusic (in concert with the iHeartMedia online radio network known as Nick Radio, which launched in 2013 and ran until mid-2019), becoming the last of the original MTV Networks Digital Suite channels to have a rebranding, a process dating back to the 2006 rebranding of VH1 Country as CMT Pure Country (now CMT Music). The last music video to be aired on the channel before the rebrand was "Clint Eastwood" by Gorillaz, and the first music video on NickMusic was "Happy" by Pharrell Williams. Some MTV Hits blocks such as Videos We Heart will be maintained, though a plan for the network to have 'guest DJ' slots by younger stars of music and Nickelodeon series never occurred, along with a move of the TeenNick Top 10 outside of repeats. It was also the last original MTV Digital Suite network made up exclusively of music video programming to end their use of an MTV brand in the U.S. at the time, though MTV Classic resumed an all-video schedule at the start of 2017 after the ratings failure of its original format.

Programming

Current 
The network has no individual or original programs; TeenNick Top 10 was cancelled in mid-2018. In electronic program listings, the titles of each 'block' merely delineate an hour in those listings and outside those titles denoting video theming, aren't mentioned on air.

Bumpin' Beats normally composes of mainly dance and pop songs, while the Crushworthy theme is mainly made up of artists with heavy social and musical appeal. The Hit List denotes the most popular songs on the charts, with Videos We Heart playing the same role. Pop Playback is mainly made up of older music videos or those from the recent past, while Weekend Vibes is mainly a light pop block. Nick Mix is normally made up of videos from past and present Nickelodeon musical artists or video remixes of the network's promotions, along with isolated musical interludes in the network's series. Finally, Fresh Faces composes of material from newer or 'on the verge' younger artists.

Availability 
NickMusic is available on most pay-TV providers, along with Verizon FiOS, and AT&T U-verse. It is one of the few remaining MTV Digital Suite original channels that is not available on DirecTV (the then MTV Digital Suite having been created to provide an advantage of digital cable-exclusive channels to providers). One of the last cable holdouts, Time Warner Cable, added the music channels of the MTV Digital Suite in the summer of 2012 back when it was branded "MTV Hits" as part of a wider agreement to give TWC's tablet application access to Viacom's networks.

International

Netherlands, Flanders, and Central Europe 

The channel launched as Nick Hits on 2 August 2007 and was rebranded as Nick Music on 1 February 2017.

Throughout central Europe, the Dutch feed replaced MTV Music 24 on 1 June 2021.

Australia & New Zealand 

An Australian version of NickMusic launched on 1 and 6 July 2020 on Foxtel and Sky (New Zealand) respectively, as a direct simulcast of the aforementioned Dutch version. In Australia, the channel replaced Foxtel's former music network [V].

Latin America 
The channel became available in some Latin American countries on 31 August 2020 replacing VH1 MegaHits and Nicktoons in other territories.

References 

Music video networks in the United States
Television channels and stations established in 2002
English-language television stations in the United States
2002 establishments in the United States
Children's television networks in the United States
Nickelodeon